

Events

Pre-1600
 418 – A papal election begins, resulting in the election of Pope Boniface I.
 457 – Majorian is acclaimed as Western Roman emperor.
 484 – Alaric II succeeds his father Euric and becomes king of the Visigoths. He establishes his capital at Aire-sur-l'Adour (Southern Gaul). 
 893 – An earthquake destroys the city of Dvin, Armenia.
1065 – Edward the Confessor's Romanesque monastic church at Westminster Abbey is consecrated.
1308 – The reign of Emperor Hanazono of Japan begins.

1601–1900
1659 – The Marathas defeat the Adilshahi forces in the Battle of Kolhapur.
1768 – King Taksin's coronation achieved through conquest as a king of Thailand and established Thonburi as a capital.
1795 – Construction of Yonge Street, formerly recognized as the longest street in the world, begins in York, Upper Canada (present-day Toronto).
1832 – John C. Calhoun becomes the first Vice President of the United States to resign. He resigned after being elected Senator from South Carolina.
1835 – Osceola leads his Seminole warriors in Florida into the Second Seminole War against the United States Army.
1836 – South Australia and Adelaide are founded.
  1836   – Spain recognizes the independence of Mexico with the signing of the Santa María–Calatrava Treaty.
1846 – Iowa is admitted as the 29th U.S. state.
1879 – Tay Bridge disaster: The central part of the Tay Rail Bridge in Dundee, Scotland, United Kingdom collapses as a train passes over it, killing 75.
1885 – Indian National Congress, a political party of India, is founded in Bombay Presidency, British India.
1895 – The Lumière brothers perform for their first paying audience at the Grand Cafe in Boulevard des Capucines.
  1895   – Wilhelm Röntgen publishes a paper detailing his discovery of a new type of radiation, which later will be known as x-rays.

1901–present
1902 – The Syracuse Athletic Club defeat the New York Philadelphians, 5–0, in the first indoor professional football game, which was held at Madison Square Garden.
1908 – The 7.1  Messina earthquake shakes Southern Italy with a maximum Mercalli intensity of XI (Extreme), killing between 75,000 and 200,000.
1912 – The first municipally owned streetcars take to the streets in San Francisco.
1918 – Constance Markievicz, while detained in Holloway prison, becomes the first woman to be elected Member of Parliament (MP) to the British House of Commons.
1941 – World War II: Operation Anthropoid, the plot to assassinate high-ranking Nazi officer Reinhard Heydrich, commences.
1943 – Soviet authorities launch Operation Ulussy, beginning the deportation of the Kalmyk nation to Siberia and Central Asia.
  1943   – World War II: After eight days of brutal house-to-house fighting, the Battle of Ortona concludes with the victory of the 1st Canadian Infantry Division over the German 1st Parachute Division and the capture of the Italian town of Ortona.
1944 – Maurice Richard becomes the first player to score eight points in one game of NHL ice hockey.
1956 – Chin Peng, David Marshall and Tunku Abdul Rahman meet in Baling, Malaya to try and resolve the Malayan Emergency situation.
1958 – "Greatest Game Ever Played": The Baltimore Colts defeat the New York Giants in the first ever National Football League sudden death overtime game at New York's Yankee Stadium to win the NFL Championship.
1967 – American businesswoman Muriel Siebert becomes the first woman to own a seat on the New York Stock Exchange.
1972 – The last scheduled day for induction into the military by the Selective Service System. Due to the fact that President Richard Nixon declared this day a national day of mourning due to former President Harry S Truman's death, approximately 300 men were not able to report due to most Federal offices being closed. Since the draft was not resumed in 1973, they were never drafted.
1973 – The United States Endangered Species Act is signed into law by President Richard Nixon.
1989 – A magnitude 5.6 earthquake hits Newcastle, New South Wales, Australia, killing 13 people.
2006 – War in Somalia: The militaries of Somalia's Transitional Federal Government and Ethiopian troops capture Mogadishu unopposed.
2009 – Forty-three people die in a suicide bombing in Karachi, Pakistan, where Shia Muslims are observing the Day of Ashura.
2014 – Indonesia AirAsia Flight 8501 crashes into the Karimata Strait en route from Surabaya to Singapore, killing all 162 people aboard.
  2014   – Nine people die and another 19 are reported missing, when the MS Norman Atlantic catches fire in the Strait of Otranto, in the Adriatic Sea, in Italian waters.

Births

Pre-1600
1461 – Louise of Savoy, French nun (d. 1503)
1510 – Nicholas Bacon, English politician (d. 1579)
1535 – Martin Eisengrein, German theologian (d. 1578)

1601–1900
1619 – Antoine Furetière, French author and scholar (d. 1688)
1635 – Elizabeth Stuart, second daughter of King Charles I of England (d. 1650)
1651 – Johann Krieger, German organist and composer (d. 1735)
1655 – Charles Cornwallis, 3rd Baron Cornwallis, English politician, Lord Lieutenant of Suffolk (d. 1698)
1665 – George FitzRoy, 1st Duke of Northumberland, English general and politician, Lord Lieutenant of Berkshire (d. 1716)
1722 – Eliza Lucas, Caribbean-American agriculturalist (d. 1793)
1724 – Christoph Franz von Buseck, Prince-Bishop of Bamberg (d. 1805)
1763 – John Molson, English-Canadian brewer, founded the Molson Brewery (d. 1836)
1775 – Jean-Gabriel Eynard, Swiss banker and photographer (d. 1863)
1789 – Catharine Maria Sedgwick, American novelist of "domestic fiction" (d. 1867)
1798 – Thomas Henderson, Scottish astronomer and mathematician (d. 1844)
1818 – Carl Remigius Fresenius, German chemist and academic (d. 1897)
1842 – Calixa Lavallée, Canadian-American lieutenant and composer (d. 1891)
1856 – Woodrow Wilson, American historian and politician, 28th President of the United States, Nobel Prize laureate (d. 1924)
1865 – Félix Vallotton, Swiss/French painter (d. 1925)
1870 – Charles Bennett, English runner (d. 1949)
1882 – Arthur Eddington, English astronomer, physicist, and mathematician (d. 1944)
  1882   – Lili Elbe, Danish model and painter (d. 1931)
1887 – Werner Kolhörster, German physicist and academic (d. 1946)
1888 – F. W. Murnau, German-American director, producer, and screenwriter (d. 1931)
1890 – Quincy Wright, American political scientist, historian, and academic (d. 1970)
1895 – Carol Ryrie Brink, American author and playwright (d. 1981)
1898 – Carl-Gustaf Rossby, Swedish-American meteorologist and academic (d. 1957)
  1898   – Shigematsu Sakaibara, Japanese admiral (d. 1947)
1900 – Ted Lyons, American baseball player (d. 1986)

1901–present
1902 – Mortimer J. Adler, American philosopher and author (d. 2001)
  1902   – Shen Congwen, Chinese author and educator (d. 1988)
1903 – Earl Hines, American pianist and bandleader (d. 1983)
  1903   – John von Neumann, Hungarian-American mathematician and physicist (d. 1957)
1907 – Ze'ev Ben-Haim, Ukrainian-Israeli linguist and academic (d. 2013)
1908 – Lew Ayres, American actor (d. 1996)
1910 – Billy Williams, American singer (d. 1972)
1911 – Wil van Beveren, Dutch sprinter and journalist (d. 2003)
1913 – Lou Jacobi, Canadian-American actor (d. 2009)
1914 – Bidia Dandaron, Russian author and educator (d. 1974)
  1914   – Pops Staples, American singer-songwriter and guitarist (d. 2000)
1917 – Ellis Clarke, Trinidadian politician, 1st President of Trinidad and Tobago (d. 2010)
1919 – Emily Cheney Neville, American author (d. 1997)
1920 – Tufty Mann, South African cricketer (d. 1952)
  1920   – Bruce McCarty, American architect, designed the Knoxville City-County Building (d. 2013)
  1920   – Steve Van Buren, Honduran-American football player (d. 2012)
  1920   – Al Wistert, American football player and coach (d. 2016)
1921 – Johnny Otis, American singer-songwriter and producer (d. 2012)
1922 – Stan Lee, American publisher, producer, and actor (d. 2018)
1924 – Girma Wolde-Giorgis, Ethiopian politician; President of Ethiopia (d. 2018)
1925 – Hildegard Knef, German actress and singer (d. 2002)
  1925   – Milton Obote, Ugandan engineer and politician, 2nd President of Uganda (d. 2005)
1926 – Donald Carr, German-English cricketer and referee  (d. 2016)
1928 – Moe Koffman, Canadian flute player, saxophonist, and composer (d. 2001)
1929 – Brian Redhead, English journalist and author (d. 1994)
  1929   – Terry Sawchuk, Canadian-American ice hockey player (d. 1970)
  1929   – Maarten Schmidt, Dutch astronomer (d. 2022)
1930 – Mariam A. Aleem, Egyptian illustrator and academic (d. 2010)
1931 – Guy Debord, French theorist and author (d. 1994)
  1931   – Martin Milner, American actor (d. 2015)
1932 – Dhirubhai Ambani, Indian businessman, founded Reliance Industries (d. 2002)
  1932   – Dorsey Burnette, American singer-songwriter (d. 1979)
  1932   – Roy Hattersley, English journalist and politician, Shadow Home Secretary
  1932   – Harry Howell, Canadian ice hockey player and coach (d. 2019)
  1932   – Nichelle Nichols, American actress (d. 2022)
  1932   – Manuel Puig, Argentinian author and playwright (d. 1990)
1933 – John Y. Brown Jr., American soldier, lawyer, and politician, 55th Governor of Kentucky (d. 2022)
1934 – Rudi Faßnacht, German footballer and manager (d. 2000)
  1934   – Maggie Smith, English actress
  1934   – Chieko Aioi, Japanese actress and voice actress (d. 2013)
1936 – Alan Coleman, English-Australian director, producer, and screenwriter (d. 2013)
  1936   – Lawrence Schiller, American journalist, director, and producer
1937 – Ratan Tata, Indian businessman and philanthropist
1938 – Dick Sudhalter, American trumpet player, scholar, and critic (d. 2008)
1939 – Philip Anschutz, American businessman, founded Anschutz Entertainment Group
  1939   – Frank McLintock, Scottish footballer and manager
  1939   – Michelle Urry, American journalist and illustrator (d. 2006)
1940 – A. K. Antony, Indian lawyer and politician, Indian Minister of Defence
  1940   – Don Francisco, Chilean-American journalist and talk show host
1941 – Intikhab Alam, Indian-Pakistani cricketer and coach
1942 – Roger Swerts, Belgian cyclist
1943 – Juan Luis Cipriani Thorne, Peruvian cardinal
  1943   – David Peterson, Canadian lawyer and politician, 20th Premier of Ontario
  1943   – Joan Ruddock, Welsh politician
1944 – Sandra Faber, American astronomer and academic
  1944   – Johnny Isakson, American sergeant and politician (d. 2021)
  1944   – Kary Mullis, American biochemist and academic, Nobel Prize laureate (d. 2019)
  1944   – Gordon Taylor, English footballer
1945 – Birendra, King of Nepal (d. 2001)
  1945   – Max Hastings, English journalist, historian, and author
1946 – Mike Beebe, American lawyer and politician, 45th Governor of Arkansas
  1946   – Pierre Falardeau, Canadian director, screenwriter, and activist (d. 2009)
  1946   – Hubert Green, American golfer (d. 2018)
  1946   – Tim Johnson, American lawyer and politician
  1946   – Barbara, Lady Judge, American-English lawyer and businesswoman
  1946   – Bill Lee, American baseball player and author
  1946   – Laffit Pincay Jr., Panamanian jockey
  1946   – Edgar Winter, American singer-songwriter, keyboard player, and producer 
1947 – Dick Diamonde, Dutch-Australian rock bass player
  1947   – Aurelio Rodríguez, Mexican baseball player, coach, and manager (d. 2000)
1948 – Ziggy Modeliste, American drummer
1950 – Alex Chilton, American singer-songwriter and guitarist (d. 2010)
  1950   – Clifford Cocks, English mathematician and cryptographer
  1950   – Rainer Maria Latzke, German-American painter and academic
1952 – Arun Jaitley, Indian lawyer and politician, 9th Indian Minister of Law and Justice (d. 2019)
  1952   – Bridget Prentice, Scottish educator and politician
1953 – Richard Clayderman, French pianist
  1953   – Tatsumi Fujinami, Japanese wrestler and promoter, founded Dradition wrestling promotion 
  1953   – Charlie Pierce, American journalist and author
  1953   – Martha Wash, American singer-songwriter 
1954 – Gayle King, American television journalist
  1954   – Denzel Washington, American actor, director, and producer
1955 – Stephen Frost, English comedian, actor, and screenwriter
  1955   – Liu Xiaobo, Chinese author, academic, and activist, Nobel Prize laureate (d. 2017)
1957 – Nigel Kennedy, English violinist
1958 – Terry Butcher, English footballer and manager
  1958   – Curt Byrum, American golfer
  1958   – Zoran Gajić, Serbian volleyball trainer
1959 – Hansjörg Kunze, German runner and sportscaster
  1959   – Daniel Léo Simpson, American composer
  1959   – Ana Torroja, Spanish singer-songwriter 
1960 – Ray Bourque, Canadian ice hockey player
  1960   – John Fitzgerald, Australian tennis player, coach, and sportscaster
  1960   – Melvin Turpin, American basketball player (d. 2010)
1961 – Kent Nielsen, Danish footballer and manager
1962 – Michel Petrucciani, French jazz pianist (d. 1999)
1964 – Tex Perkins, Australian singer-songwriter
  1964   – Maite Zúñiga, Spanish runner
1965 – Allar Levandi, Estonian skier
1967 – Chris Ware, American illustrator
1968 – Akihiko Hoshide, Japanese engineer and astronaut
1969 – Linus Torvalds, Finnish-American computer programmer, developed Linux kernel
1970 – Elaine Hendrix, American actress
  1970   – James Jett, American sprinter and football player
  1970   – Brenda Schultz-McCarthy, Dutch tennis player
1971 – Benny Agbayani, American baseball player
  1971   – Sergi Barjuán, Spanish footballer and manager
  1971   – Anita Doth, Dutch singer-songwriter 
  1971   – William Gates, American basketball player
1972 – Roberto Palacios, Peruvian footballer
  1972   – Patrick Rafter, Australian-Bermudian tennis player and model
  1972   – Adam Vinatieri, American football player
1973 – Holger Blume, German sprinter
  1973   – Marc Blume, German sprinter
  1973   – Seth Meyers, American actor, producer, screenwriter, and talk show host
  1973   – Ids Postma, Dutch speed skater
1974 – Jocelyn Enriquez, American singer
  1974   – Rob Niedermayer, Canadian ice hockey player
  1974   – Markus Weinzierl, German footballer and manager
1975 – B. J. Ryan, American baseball player
1976 – Joe Manganiello, American actor
  1976   – Trond Nymark, Norwegian race walker
  1976   – Ben Tune, Australian rugby player
  1976   – Igor Žiković, Croatian footballer
1977 – Derrick Brew, American sprinter
  1977   – Shane Elford, Australian rugby league player
  1977   – Seun Ogunkoya, Nigerian sprinter
1978 – Chris Coyne, Australian footballer and manager
  1978   – John Legend, American singer-songwriter, pianist, and actor
1979 – James Blake, American tennis player
  1979   – Zach Hill, American musician and artist
  1979   – Senna Gammour, German singer-songwriter 
  1979   – Bill Hall, American baseball player
  1979   – Noomi Rapace, Swedish actress
1980 – Lomana LuaLua, Congolese footballer
  1980   – Ryta Turava, Belarusian race walker
1981 – Narsha, South Korean singer and dancer
  1981   – Khalid Boulahrouz, Dutch footballer
  1981   – Elizabeth Jordan Carr, American journalist
  1981   – Sienna Miller, American-born British actress and fashion designer
  1981   – Frank Turner, English singer-songwriter and guitarist 
  1981   – Mika Väyrynen, Finnish footballer
1982 – François Gourmet, Belgian decathlete
  1982   – Curtis Glencross, Canadian hockey player
1984 – Martin Kaymer, German golfer
  1984   – Duane Solomon, American runner
1986 – Tom Huddlestone, English footballer
1990 – Ayele Abshero, Ethiopian runner
  1990   – Bastiaan Lijesen, Dutch swimmer
1994 – Adam Peaty, English swimmer

Deaths

Pre-1600
 925 – Wang Zongbi, general of the Chinese state of Former Shu
1218 – Robert II, Count of Dreux (b. 1154)
1297 – Hugh Aycelin, French cardinal (b. 1230)
1326 – Sir David II Strathbogie, Earl of Atholl, Constable of Scotland, and Chief Warden of Northumberland
1367 – Ashikaga Yoshiakira, Japanese shōgun (b. 1330)
1394 – Maria Angelina Doukaina Palaiologina, queen of Epirus (b. 1350)
1446 – Antipope Clement VIII (b. 1369)
1491 – Bertoldo di Giovanni, Italian sculptor (b. c. 1435)
1503 – Piero the Unfortunate, Italian ruler (b. 1471)
1538 – Andrea Gritti, Doge of Venice (b. 1455)
1547 – Konrad Peutinger, German humanist and antiquarian (b. 1465)
1558 – Hermann Finck, German organist and composer (b. 1527)

1601–1900
1622 – Francis de Sales, French bishop and saint (b. 1567)
1663 – Francesco Maria Grimaldi, Italian mathematician and physicist (b. 1618)
1671 – Johann Friedrich Gronovius, German scholar and critic (b. 1611)
1694 – Mary II of England (b. 1662)
1706 – Pierre Bayle, French philosopher and author (b. 1647)
1708 – Joseph Pitton de Tournefort, French botanist and mycologist (b. 1656)
1715 – William Carstares, Scottish minister and academic (b. 1649)
1734 – Rob Roy MacGregor, Scottish outlaw (b. 1671)
1736 – Antonio Caldara, Italian composer (b. 1670)
1785 – Peter Ernst Wilde, Polish-Estonian physician and journalist (b. 1732)
1795 – Eugenio Espejo, Ecuadorian physician and lawyer (b. 1747)
1859 – Thomas Babington Macaulay, 1st Baron Macaulay, English historian and politician, Secretary at War (b. 1800)
1872 – James Van Ness, American lawyer and politician, 7th Mayor of San Francisco (b. 1808)
1890 – Dennis Miller Bunker, American painter (b. 1861)
1897 – William Corby, American priest and academic (b. 1833)
1900 – Alexandre de Serpa Pinto, Portuguese soldier and explorer (b. 1846)

1901–present
1907 – Louise Granberg, Swedish playwright (b. 1812)
1913 – Ahmet Mithat Efendi, Turkish journalist and translator (b. 1844)
1916 – Eduard Strauss, Austrian violinist and composer (b. 1835)
1917 – Alfred Edwin McKay, Canadian captain and pilot (b. 1892)
1918 – Olavo Bilac, Brazilian poet and journalist (b. 1865)
1919 – Johannes Rydberg, Swedish physicist and academic (b. 1854)
1924 – Léon Bakst, Russian painter and costume designer (b. 1866)
1932 – Jack Blackham, Australian cricketer (b. 1854)
1935 – Clarence Day, American author and illustrator (b. 1874)
1937 – Maurice Ravel, French pianist and composer (b. 1875)
1938 – Florence Lawrence, Canadian actress (b. 1886)
1942 – Alfred Flatow, German gymnast (b. 1869)
1943 – Steve Evans, American baseball player (b. 1885)
1945 – Theodore Dreiser, American novelist and journalist (b. 1871)
1946 – Elie Nadelman, Polish-American sculptor (b. 1882)
1947 – Victor Emmanuel III of Italy (b. 1869)
1949 – Jack Lovelock, New Zealand runner and soldier (b. 1910)
1959 – Ante Pavelić, Croatian fascist dictator during World War II (b. 1889)
1960 – Philippe Panneton, Canadian physician, academic, and diplomat (b. 1895)
1963 – Paul Hindemith, German violist, composer, and conductor (b. 1895)
1967 – Katharine McCormick, American biologist and philanthropist (b. 1875)
1968 – David Ogilvy, 12th Earl of Airlie, Scottish peer, soldier and courtier (b. 1893)
1971 – Max Steiner, Austrian-American pianist, composer, and conductor (b. 1888)
1976 – Katharine Byron, American politician (b. 1903)
1981 – Allan Dwan, Canadian-American director, producer, and screenwriter (b. 1885)
1983 – Dennis Wilson, American drummer, songwriter, and producer (b. 1944)
1984 – Sam Peckinpah, American director, producer, and screenwriter (b. 1925)
  1984   – Mary Stewart, Baroness Stewart of Alvechurch, British politician and educator (b. 1903)
1986 – John D. MacDonald, American colonel and author (b. 1916)
  1986   – Jan Nieuwenhuys, Dutch painter (b. 1922)
1989 – Hermann Oberth, Romanian-German physicist and engineer (b. 1894)
1990 – Warren Skaaren, American screenwriter and producer (b. 1946)
1992 – Sal Maglie, American baseball player and coach (b. 1917)
1993 – William L. Shirer, American journalist and historian (b. 1904)
1994 – Jean-Louis Lévesque, Canadian businessman and philanthropist (b. 1911)
1999 – Clayton Moore, American actor (b. 1914)
2001 – Samuel Abraham Goldblith, American lieutenant, biologist, and engineer (b. 1919)
  2001   – William X. Kienzle, American priest and author (b. 1928)
2003 – Benjamin Thurman Hacker, American admiral (b. 1935)
2004 – Jerry Orbach, American actor and singer (b. 1935)
  2004   – Susan Sontag, American novelist, essayist, critic, and playwright (b. 1933)
2006 – Jamal Karimi-Rad, Iranian politician, Iranian Minister of Justice (b. 1956)
2008 – Irene Lieblich, Polish-American painter and illustrator (b. 1923)
2009 – Jimmy Sullivan, American musician, composer and songwriter. Known by his stage name The Rev (b. 1981)
2010 – Billy Taylor, American pianist and composer (b. 1921)
  2010   – Terry Peder Rasmussen, American serial killer (b. 1943)
2012 – Nicholas Ambraseys, Greek-English seismologist and engineer (b. 1929)
  2012   – Mark Crispin, American computer scientist and academic, designed the IMAP (b. 1956)
  2012   – Václav Drobný, Czech footballer (b. 1980)
  2012   – Frankie Walsh, Irish hurler and manager (b. 1936)
2013 – Halton Arp, American-German astronomer and critic (b. 1927)
  2013   – Esther Borja, Cuban soprano and actress (b. 1913)
  2013   – Andrew Jacobs, Jr., American soldier, lawyer, and politician (b. 1932)
  2013   – Alfred Marshall, American businessman, founded Marshalls (b. 1919)
  2013   – Joseph Ruskin, American actor and producer (b. 1924)
  2013   – Ilya Tsymbalar, Ukrainian-Russian footballer and manager (b. 1969)
2014 – Vahan Hovhannisyan, Armenian politician (b. 1956)
  2014   – Frankie Randall, American singer-songwriter (b. 1938)
  2014   – Leelah Alcorn, American transgender teenager (b. 1997)
2015 – John Bradbury, English drummer and songwriter (b. 1953)
  2015   – Eloy Inos, Mariana Islander businessman and politician, 8th Governor of the Northern Mariana Islands (b. 1949)
  2015   – Lemmy, English musician, singer, and songwriter (b. 1945)
2016 – Debbie Reynolds, American actress, singer and dancer (b. 1932)
  2016   – Jean-Christophe Victor, French political scientist (b. 1947)
2017 – Rose Marie, American actress and comedienne (b. 1923)
2021 – Grichka Bogdanoff, French television presenter and scientific essayist (b. 1949)
  2021   – John Madden, American football Hall of Fame coach and commentator (b. 1936)
  2021   – Harry Reid, American lawyer, politician, and former Senate majority leader (b. 1939)

Holidays and observances
 Christian feast day:
 Abel (Coptic Church)
 Caterina Volpicelli
 Feast of the Holy Innocents or Childermas; in Spain and Latin American countries the festival is celebrated with pranks (inocentadas), similar to April Fools' Day (Catholic Church, Church of England, Lutheran Church), and its related observances:
Els Enfarinats (Ibi, Spain)
 Simon the Athonite
 December 28 (Eastern Orthodox liturgics)
 King Taksin Memorial Day (Thailand)
 Proclamation Day (South Australia), celebration started on the day following Christmas (South Australia)
 Republic Day (South Sudan)
 The fourth of the Twelve Days of Christmas (Western Christianity)

References

External links

 BBC: On This Day
 
 Historical Events on December 28

Days of the year
December